Bukhari or Bokhari means "from Bukhara (Uzbekistan)" in Persian, Arabic, Urdu and Hebrew, and may refer to:

People 
al-Bukhari (810–870), Islamic hadith scholar and author of the 
Bukhari Daud (1959–2021), Indonesian academician and regent of Aceh Besar

Books 
 (9th century), one of the two most authoritative hadith collections in Sunni Islam

Language 
Bukhari or Bukhori language, Judeo-Tajik dialect historically spoken by Jews from Bukhara (Uzbekistan)

Tools 
Bukhari (heater), a type of space heater from North India and Pakistan

Other uses 
Bukhari (surname), a nisba and surname (including a list of people with this name)
Bukharan Jews
Emirate of Bukhara

See also
 

Language and nationality disambiguation pages